Vacuuming Completely Nude in Paradise is a television film directed by Danny Boyle released and produced by BBC in association with Destiny Films for BBC Two on 30 September 2001. A satire on door-to-door salesmen, it stars Timothy Spall, who was nominated for a British Academy Television Award for Best Actor for his performance.

Plot
Pete, a young man trying to make a living by creating mixtapes of electronic music, acts as a DJ accompanying his girlfriend Sheila while she performs a stripogram at a retirement party for 'Throat', an elderly vacuum salesman with two weeks to live. 'Throat' dies at the party and Pete is offered a job as a replacement for 'Throat'. For his training period, Pete is paired with Tommy Rag, a gruff and aggressive high-performing salesman who feels superior to the rest of the office and views a salesman nicknamed 'Pockmark' as his only real competition for the next prize for leading sales, a two-week vacation in Benidorm.

Sheila tells Pete that she will not have sex with him anymore until he makes his first sale. The next morning, Tommy gives Pete a new suit and throws his old clothes out the window of the moving car. Pete asks to make a sale on his own and offers to split the commission with Tommy. Tommy drops Pete off in a poor area and warns him to get out quickly after the sale without listening to any sob stories. He sells a vacuum to a single mother of four who continuously laments all of her troubles, then he notices her crying after he leaves. Sheila welcomes him home in a leather catsuit, eager for sex, but Pete is so wracked with guilt that he returns to the poor woman's home, takes back the vacuum, tears up her contract and gives her some money. While he is leaving he is beaten and robbed of the vacuum by three young men. He apologises to Sheila, who calls him a loser.

The next morning Pete finds a note from Sheila that she has left. Desperate to get information about Sheila's whereabouts, he kicks open the door of an elderly downstairs neighbour nicknamed 'Clayface', only to find a candlelit room full of stacks of newspapers, some dating back to 1945. He turns a corner and is shocked to discover the old woman's corpse, causing him to bump into a candle and set the newspapers on fire. He smothers the fire with newspapers as Tommy impatiently beeps the car horn. While waiting on hold for the police, Tommy tells Pete of a dream he had about Uki, the new Head of IT, transforming the office into a sales call centre operated by intelligent women gently guiding customers toward the sale instead of the aggressive sales approaches he currently knows and admits to hating. In the dream he follows her into a computer screen leading to a tropical beach. She is gone but there is a gold vacuum on the beach and he begins vacuuming completely nude in Paradise, weeping tears of joy.

At the next house, Tommy goes upstairs to have sex with the potential customer, whom he has nicknamed 'Spaniard', while Pete has sex with her lonely mentally handicapped daughter. Tommy successfully closes the sale but Pete once again feels guilty about the experience. They pick up a hitchhiker, a DJ who calls himself 'De Kid'. Pete asks him questions about how he got started and asks him to listen to his mixtape. De Kid takes the tape and promises to play it at his show that night, then tells Pete the secret that 'silence is loud'. Tommy drops off the final sales contracts at the office as Pete falls asleep and dreams about life as a successful DJ. He awakens to find 'Spaniard' and her daughter in the car as Tommy is driving them to the prize ceremony at Metropole Hotel in Blackpool, predicting himself the winner.

At the prize ceremony, Uki announces 'Pockmark' as the winner of the Golden Vac award. Tommy ties with the deceased 'Throat' for second place. Enraged, Tommy barges into the ladies' restroom and demands answers from 'Stonecheeks'. She admits to him that this will be the last competition and that Uki, who she jealously reveals is in an intimate relationship with the boss, will be working to focus more on Internet sales, eliminating many of the jobs for salesmen. She tells Tommy that he was one sale short of 'Pockmark' and that he tied with 'Throat' because the boss convinced the other salesmen to donate some of their sales to the 'Throat Memorial'. Meanwhile, Pete sees that De Kid is working as the DJ at the party and that his own mixtape is getting the crowd dancing. Tommy suddenly pulls the plugs on the DJ equipment and angrily begins choking Pete, whom he blames for the loss, but is stopped by the mentally handicapped girl lashing him with a whip to protect Pete. Tommy is sacked and kicked out on the street. Peter is given a chance to work the DJ equipment to the adulation of the crowd as Tommy angrily storms toward the sea, discarding his clothing and ultimately throwing a vacuum into the tide before he collapses. 'Spaniard' chases after him and finds his dead body on the beach.

Cast

Timothy Spall as Tommy Rag
Michael Begley as Pete
Katy Cavanagh as Sheila
Caroline Ashley as Uki 
Alice Barry as Lorna
Terry Barry as Ted
Julie Brown as Receptionist
James Cartwright as De Kid
Lorraine Cheshire as Hot Pot
Keith Clifford as Sidney
David Crellin as Mr Ron
James Foster as Porter
Sandra Gough as Spaniard
Marvin Henriques as Tony
Renny Krupinski as Pockmark
Rodney Litchfield as Throat
Gareth Miller as Mugger
Caroline Pegg as Boney Lyn
Maggie Tagney as Stonecheeks
Miriam Watkins as Claywoman
Jonathan Bridge as Bespectacled Man at Party (uncredited)
Jason Croot as Gangster (uncredited)

External links

Films directed by Danny Boyle
2001 films
2001 television films
2000s business films
2001 comedy films
BBC television comedy
British satirical films
Films scored by John Murphy (composer)
Films about businesspeople
Films about DJs
2000s British films
British comedy television films